Hallett Cove Beach railway station is located on the Seaford line. Situated in the southern Adelaide suburb of Hallett Cove , it is 22.9 kilometres from Adelaide station.

History
Hallett Cove Beach station opened on 30 June 1974 when the line was extended from Hallett Cove. At the time, few services terminated at Hallett Cove Beach with most services terminating at Marino or Hallett Cove. Regular services commenced on 25 January 1976 when services were extended to Christie Downs.

The station closed on 29 August 2010 for an 11-month rebuild which included building a canopy over the station.

Services by platform

References 

South Australian Railways Working Timetable Book No 265 30 June 1974

External links

Flickr gallery

Railway stations in Adelaide
Railway stations in Australia opened in 1974